is a former Japanese football player.

Playing career
Miyamoto was born in Shimonoseki on December 3, 1982. After graduating from high school, he joined J1 League club Avispa Fukuoka in 2001. On July 7, he debuted as right side back against Nagoya Grampus Eight.
 However, he could only play this match in 2001 and Avispa was relegated to J2 League. He played many matches from 2003 and he became a regular player as center back in 2005. Avispa was also promoted to J1 end of 2005 season. Although Avispa was relegated to J2 in a year, he played many matches until 2007. However his opportunity to play decreased from 2008. In August 2009, he moved to newly was promoted to J2 club, Tochigi SC. He became a regular center back soon and played all matches except for suspension in 2009 season. However he could not play many matches in 2010 season. In 2011, he moved to Giravanz Kitakyushu. He played as regular player until 2013. However his opportunity to play decreased from 2014 season and he retired end of 2015 season.

Club statistics

References

External links

1982 births
Living people
Association football people from Yamaguchi Prefecture
Japanese footballers
J1 League players
J2 League players
Avispa Fukuoka players
Tochigi SC players
Giravanz Kitakyushu players
Association football defenders
People from Shimonoseki